Arthur Lewin Alexander  (6 March 1907 – 17 April 1971) was a British police officer and was the last non-Ghanaian Inspector General of Police of the Ghana Police Service from 1 May 1958 to 8 October 1959. After returning to England, he served as secretary of the Henley Royal Regatta from 1959 to his death.

He was awarded the King's Police Medal for Meritorious Service in the 1951 Birthday Honours and was appointed an Officer of the Order of the British Empire in the 1959 New Year Honours.

Alexander was born in Hutton, Essex to Lewin Venn Alexander, a shipping agent and underwriter, and Miriam Devereux Alexander. He died in Reading, Berkshire in 1971.

References

1907 births
1971 deaths
Ghanaian police officers
Ghanaian Inspector Generals of Police
Officers of the Order of the British Empire
People from Hutton, Essex
Colonial recipients of the Queen's Police Medal
British expatriates in Ghana
British colonial police officers